The 1902 Primera División was the 3rd. season of top-flight football in Uruguay.

Overview
The tournament consisted of a round-robin championship. It involved six teams, and the champion was Club Nacional de Football after winning all matches played.

Teams

League standings

References
Uruguay – List of final tables (RSSSF)

Uruguayan Primera División seasons
1902 in South American football leagues
1902 in Uruguayan football